Strong Heart may refer to:

 Strong Heart (album), a 2000 album by Patty Loveless
 Strong Heart (Mai Kuraki song)
 Strong Heart (T.G. Sheppard song)
 Strong Heart (TV series), a South Korean talk show

See also
 Strongheart, male German Shepherd and early canine star of films